Fish Out of Water is a 1993 Danish comedy film directed by Erik Clausen.

Cast 
 Erik Clausen - Viggo
 Helle Ryslinge - Oda
 Leif Sylvester Petersen - Iversen
 Anne Marie Helger - Karen
 Bjarne Liller - Snedker
  - Carlsen
 Lene Brøndum - Fru Sørensen
  - Falsk Læge
  - Direktør
  - Claus

References

External links 

1993 comedy films
1993 films
Danish comedy films
1990s Danish-language films